The Valley of the Pharaohs is a role-playing game written by Matthew Balent and published by Palladium Books in September 1983. Released several years before Palladium established the Megaversal system, uniting all of its game lines under a single ruleset, the mechanics of Valley of the Pharaohs differ in many respects from the one currently used in Palladium role-playing games. It has been out of print for more than 30 years.

Contents 
The boxed game set featured:
50-page illustrated rulebook
16 by 20-inch color map of Egypt c. 1450 BCE (Dynasty XVIII of the New Kingdom)
12 accessory pages, including:
Maps of nomes and the Nile Valley
Diagrams of boats, houses, fortifications, the Giza Necropolis, Step Pyramid, Temple of Hatshepsut, Temple at Karnak, and True Pyramid
Sample character sheet

Reviews
Different Worlds #45

References

External links 

The Valley of the Pharaohs at RPG Geek Database
The Valley of the Pharaohs at RPGnet Game Index

Megaverse (Palladium Books)
Historical role-playing games
Role-playing games introduced in 1983